Cape Columbia is the northernmost point of land of Canada, located on Ellesmere Island in the Qikiqtaaluk Region of Nunavut. It marks the westernmost coastal point of Lincoln Sea in the Arctic Ocean. It is the world's northernmost point of land outside Greenland.

As the northernmost point of Canada, Cape Columbia is exposed to the ice drift of the Arctic pack ice. As a result, mighty ice pressure ridges can be piled up at Cape Columbia.

History

In 1876, Pelham Aldrich was the first European to reach Cape Columbia. He was a lieutenant with the expedition (1875-76) of British explorer George Nares.

Peary 
Robert Peary chose the Cape as the location for the northernmost depot of his final attempt to reach the Pole (1909), not only for its proximity but because it is located far enough west to be out of the ice current setting down Robeson Channel. From Cape Columbia his party planned to strike straight north over the ice of the Arctic Sea.

Peary's sledge divisions left the Roosevelt from February 15 to 22, 1909, rendezvoused at Cape Columbia, and on March 1 the expedition left Cape Columbia, heading across the Arctic Ocean for the Pole. The 84th parallel was crossed on March 18, the 86th on March 23.  Peary returned to land at Cape Columbia again on April 23. Peary's claim to have reached the North Pole has long been subject to doubt. While some polar historians believe that Peary honestly thought he had reached the pole, others have suggested that he was guilty of deliberately exaggerating his accomplishments.

References

Columbia
Extreme points of Canada
Ellesmere Island